Koestono "Tonny" Koeswoyo (19 January 1936 – 27 March 1987) was an Indonesian rock musician and leader of the music group Koes Plus. Koeswoyo played piano, guitar and keyboard.

References

1936 births
1987 deaths
Deaths from colorectal cancer
English-language singers from Indonesia
20th-century Indonesian male singers
Indonesian rock singers
Javanese people
People from Tuban